Ripples is the seventh studio album by English singer Ian Brown, and produced by himself. The album was initially set to be released on 1 March 2019, but soon after the album's release date was brought forward to 1 February 2019.

The album's release was announced on 25 October 2018 with the release of the first single "First World Problems". A music video was released to promote the single and the album. The video shows Brown cycling by the Bridgewater Canal on a bike similar to the one seen in the F.E.A.R. music video. In the video, Brown is seen wearing a sweatshirt with the words “I know the truth and I know what you’re thinking” on the back, a reference to the Stone Roses song "Fools Gold". Throughout the video, Brown plays on several instruments, including guitars, bass, drums, bongos, and a cabasa. Towards the end of the video, Brown rides the bike past a wall decorated with the Manchester bee, and at the end, throws a pink Stratocaster from a bridge into the canal below. The Stratocaster is seen floating in the water before the video fades to black. This album is Brown's first album for a decade since his previous album My Way (2009). The album received mixed-to-positive reviews from music critics.

Track listing

Charts

References 

2019 albums
Ian Brown albums